Kamara is a village in Mulgi Parish, Viljandi County in Estonia.

References

Villages in Viljandi County